Talpa is an unincorporated community in Coleman County, Texas, United States. According to the Handbook of Texas, the community had an estimated population of 127 in 2000.

Geography
Talpa is located at  (31.7765369, -99.7095226). It is situated along U.S. Highway 67 in west-central Coleman County, less than 20 miles from Ballinger to the west and Coleman to the east.

Climate
The climate in this area is characterized by hot, humid summers and generally mild to cool winters.  According to the Köppen climate classification system, Talpa has a humid subtropical climate, Cfa on climate maps.

History
The community was founded in the early 1880s. It developed as a Santa Fe Railroad switching point. The origin of the name Talpa is not known; some say it was named for the catalpa tree and others from a rock, possibly talpatate, a rock of superficial origin resembling caliche. The original town of Talpa was mapped out in the early part of 1900, consisting of 130 blocks, of 8, 9, 10, and 20 lots per block. Several additions were mapped out, including W.J. Sayre (1901), Laughlin (1900-1901), and Cusenbary (1909). Talpa incorporated during either the 1920s or 1930s. The town had a population of 254 in 1940 with 16 businesses operating in the community. The number of residents steadily declined throughout the remainder of the 20th century – from 234 in 1950 and 195 in 1960, to 122 in 1980. Talpa citizens voted to unincorporate in an election held on April 7, 1982. Four years later, on July 1, 1986, the Talpa Centennial Independent School District and Mozelle Independent School District merged to form the Panther Creek Consolidated Independent School District. By 1990, around 127 residents were living in Talpa. That figure remained unchanged in 2000.

Talpa has a post office with the zip code of 76882.

Education
Public education in the community of Talpa is provided by the Panther Creek Consolidated Independent School District. The district has two campuses, Panther Creek Elementary School (prekindergarten - grade 5) and Panther Creek High School (grades 6-12).

On July 1, 1986, the Talpa Centennial Independent School District consolidated into the Mozelle Independent School District, which at that point was renamed Panther Creek.

Notable residents 
Roxy Gordon

References

Unincorporated communities in Texas
Unincorporated communities in Coleman County, Texas
Former cities in Texas
Populated places disestablished in 1982